The Delhi IT Park is an IT park complex developed by Delhi Metro Rail Corporation (DMRC). It is a Software Technology Park situated in Shastri Park close to the metro station. The IT Park complex comprises three separate blocks. The IT Park Block 1 has been operational since April 2005. The construction of the IT Park Block 2 has been completed and IT Park Block 3 has been operational since August 2011. 

Block 1 and Block 2 comprise two basements, one podium floor, eight floors, a terrace, and a separate sub-station building for each block. The podium floor of Block 2 has a gymnasium, a conference hall, and training rooms, which are common to all the Blocks.

Block 1 has a parking capacity of 278 cars and Block 2 has parking for 223 cars. There is external parking as well, where 453 cars can be parked. 

The companies currently operating in Delhi IT Park are RBS, RCIL and Genpact.

External links
Delhi Metro Rail Corporation
National Informatics Centre

Software technology parks in India
Economy of Delhi
North East Delhi district